Ellen Price (17 January 1814 – 10 February 1887) was an English novelist better known as Mrs. Henry Wood. She is best remembered for her 1861 novel East Lynne. Many of her books sold well internationally and were widely read in the United States. In her time, she surpassed Charles Dickens in fame in Australia.

Life
Ellen Price was born in Worcester in 1814. In 1836 she married Henry Wood, who worked in the banking and shipping trade in Dauphiné in the South of France, where they lived for 20 years. On the failure of Wood's business, the family (including four children) returned to England and settled in Upper Norwood near London, where Ellen Wood turned to writing. This supported the family. Henry Wood died in 1866. She wrote over 30 novels, many of which (especially East Lynne) enjoyed remarkable popularity. Among the best known are Danesbury House, Oswald Cray, Mrs. Halliburton's Troubles, The Channings, Lord Oakburn's Daughters and The Shadow of Ashlydyat. Her writing tone would be described as "conservative and Christian," occasionally expressing religious rhetoric.

In 1867, Wood purchased the English magazine Argosy, which had been founded by Alexander Strahan in 1865. She wrote much of the magazine herself, but other contributors included Hesba Stretton, Julia Kavanagh, Christina Rossetti, Sarah Doudney and Rosa Nouchette Carey. Wood continued as its editor until her death in 1887, when her son Charles Wood took over.

Wood's works were translated into many languages, including French and Russian. Leo Tolstoy, in a 9 March 1872 letter to his older brother Sergei, noted that he was "reading Mrs. Wood's wonderful novel In the Maze".

Wood wrote several works of supernatural fiction, including "The Ghost" (1867) and the oft-anthologized "Reality or Delusion?" (1868).

At her death caused by bronchitis, Wood's estate was valued at over £36,000, which was then a considerable sum. She was buried in Highgate Cemetery, London. A monument to her was unveiled in Worcester Cathedral in 1916.

Works

These are the first published UK editions as catalogued by the British Library, with supplementary information from a specialist booksellers' catalogue.

References

Further reading
Jennifer Phegley (2005), "Domesticating the Sensation Novelist: Ellen Price Wood as Author and Editor of the 'Argosy Magazine'," Victorian Periodicals Review, Vol. XXXVIII, No. 2, pp. 180–198
Thomas Seecombe (1900), "Wood, Ellen (1814–1887)," Dictionary of National Biography: Williamson-Worden, Vol. LXII, pp. 355–357
Adeline Sergeant (1897), "Mrs. Henry Wood". In: Women Novelists of Queen Victoria's Reign, London: Hurst & Blackett, pp. 174–192
Charles W. Wood (1887), "Mrs. Henry Wood. In Memorian," The Argosy, Vol. XLIII, pp. 251, 334 and 442

External links

Works by Mrs. Henry Wood at Hathi Trust
 

Mrs. Henry Wood website

Mrs Henry Wood Bibliography Of Contributions To Periodicals

1887 deaths
1814 births
Victorian novelists
Victorian women writers
19th-century British novelists
Writers from Worcester, England
English Christians
English women novelists
English horror writers
Ghost story writers
Burials at Highgate Cemetery
Deaths from bronchitis
Women horror writers
19th-century English women writers
British magazine editors
Women magazine editors